Lukáš Klok (born June 7, 1995) is a Czech professional ice hockey defenceman currently playing with HC Lugano of the National League (NL).

Playing career
He made his professional debut with HC Vítkovice Ridera of the Czech Extraliga. Following his fourth season with Vítkovice in 2017–18, Klok opted to sign a one-year deal with Slovak club, HC Slovan Bratislava, of the KHL on June 22, 2018.

On 14 July 2022, Klok was signed as an undrafted free agent to a one-year entry-level contract by the Arizona Coyotes of the National Hockey League (NHL). Klok participated in training camp and pre-season with the Coyotes before he was re-assigned to begin his first professional season in North America with American Hockey League (AHL) affiliate, the Tucson Roadrunners. Klok made four appearances on the blueline with the Roadrunners to start the 2022–23 season before he was placed on unconditional waivers by the Coyotes in opting to mutually terminate his contract on 28 October 2022. 

Klok returned to Europe and opted to join Swedish club Rögle BK of the Swedish Hockey League (SHL) for the remainder of the season on 5 November 2022. Klok featured in just 11 games from the blueline with Rögle BK before leaving the club prematurely to sign for the remainder of the season with Swiss National League club, HC Lugano, on 13 January 2023.

Career statistics

Regular season and playoffs

International

References

External links
 

1995 births
Living people
Czech ice hockey defencemen
AZ Havířov players
HC Lugano players
Lukko players
HC Neftekhimik Nizhnekamsk players
Ice hockey players at the 2022 Winter Olympics
Olympic ice hockey players of the Czech Republic
Rögle BK players
HC Slovan Bratislava players
Sportspeople from Ostrava
Tucson Roadrunners players
HC Vítkovice players
Youngstown Phantoms players
Czech expatriate ice hockey players in the United States
Czech expatriate ice hockey players in Russia
Czech expatriate ice hockey players in Slovakia
Czech expatriate ice hockey players in Finland
Czech expatriate ice hockey players in Switzerland